Pioneering Spirit  (formerly Pieter Schelte) is a catamaran crane vessel owned by the Switzerland-based Allseas Group designed for the single-lift installation and removal of large oil and gas platforms and the installation of record-weight pipelines. The ,  vessel is the world's largest vessel by gross tonnage, and since September 2021 also the largest floating sheerleg in the world. It was built in South Korea by Daewoo Shipbuilding & Marine Engineering in 2013 at a cost of €2.6 billion. It commenced offshore operations in August 2016.

Development

The initial concept, by Allseas technical director W.P. Kaldenbach, was of a vessel capable of lifting entire platforms, and in 1987 Allseas declared its intention to build it.  The initial idea featured two rigidly connected, self-propelled supertankers, with a large slot at the bows enabling it to install platform topsides in one piece. Early designs featured a flotation and ballasting system and active motion compensation system to facilitate a controlled transfer of a topsides' weight from the vessel to a platform substructure. Allseas developed the original idea to include steel jacket installation, jackets and topsides removal and rigid pipelay capabilities. 
 
The emphasis switched from the conversion of two existing tankers to a new-build hull in 2004, though retaining the catamaran concept.  The decision was prompted by a lack of suitable vessels to convert, the lower costs associated with a new-build, and the need to house sophisticated equipment – such as a dynamic positioning system – in the hull.

In 2007, twenty years after the idea was first conceived, Allseas announced plans to build the Pieter Schelte, a twin-hulled platform installation / decommissioning and pipelay vessel.

Construction

Allseas placed orders for machinery, including generators and thrusters, in 2007, and for the high-tensile steel for the lifting systems in 2008. After the global financial crisis weakened funding, the company was forced to postpone the building schedule and as a result delayed the awarding of the hull construction contract. Finnish engineering company Deltamarin performed detail engineering in 2009.

Pioneering Spirit departed Daewoo in November 2014 and arrived at the Maasvlakte 2, Port of Rotterdam, for completion and commissioning, on January 8, 2015. After the topside lifting system was installed, she left Rotterdam on 6 August 2016.

The original name caused controversy due to Pieter Schelte Heerema's service in the Waffen-SS during World War II. As a result, in February 2015, Allseas announced that the vessel's name would be changed to Pioneering Spirit.

Upgrades 
In July 2019, Allseas announced a plan to upgrade the lift capacity from 48,000 tonnes to 60,000 tonnes. This reason for the same is to enable the removal of Statfjord A platform in the North Sea.

In September 2021, a set of sheerlegs with a lifting capacity of 20,000 tonnes was installed on the stern deck of the ship, permitting it to also hoist platform jackets. This also made it the largest floating sheerleg in the world.

Design

Pioneering Spirit is the world's largest vessel, in terms of her gross tonnage (403,342 gt), breadth, and displacement. The maximum  topside lift capacity is achieved by operating as a semi-submersible. For removal of topsides, the vessel straddles the intended payload with the slot formed by the twin bows. The slot measures  (L×W). After straddling the payload, Pioneering Spirit takes on ballast to lower, and two sets of eight (one set per bow) retractable motion-compensated horizontal lifting beams are extended under the payload. Once the load is secure, the vessel offloads the ballast, rising in the water and partially transferring the load to the beams.
 
Aside from the ballast lifting system, Pioneering Spirit is equipped with large conventional cranes, including a sheerleg and rotating cranes. The lift beams for the Jacket Lifting System were installed in 2021. A  special purpose crane built by Huisman is scheduled for delivery in the second half of 2018. The tub mounted crane will be available for additional lifts for jacket and topsides installation such as pile handling and bridge installation. The first major lifts with the new Huisman crane were performed in August 2020.

When equipped with the Stinger, Pioneering Spirit can be used to lay pipe. Pipe segments are welded together on board the vessel, then are placed on the Stinger, where they roll into the water. The Stinger is curved to guide the pipe to the bottom of the ocean. It is attached to the Stinger Transition Frame (STF), which provides an interface between the Stinger and the vessel; the STF is installed in the bow slot when attached to the vessel.

The vessel is equipped with eight, 20-cylinder (20V32/44CR) MAN 11,200 kW diesel generators providing a total installed power of 95 MW, driving 12 Rolls-Royce azimuth thrusters which provide dynamic positioning (DP3) and for propulsion. The accommodation has room for 571 persons in two-berth cabins.

Iron Lady and Bumblebee

Allseas also constructed two barges to assist Pioneering Spirit. Bumblebee was built specifically to store the Stinger and STF when it is not in use.

Projects

Pioneering Spirit performed her first commercial lift, removal of Repsol's  Yme mobile offshore production unit (MOPU) on 22 August 2016. The decision to remove the platform was made in 2013, and the contract for the removal of the topsides was subsequently awarded to Allseas. Pioneering Spirit collided with the caisson of the Yme platform during the removal.

On 28 April 2017 Pioneering Spirit performed the single-lift removal of Shell's  Brent Delta topsides. The vessel delivered the topsides to Able UK's Seaton Port yard, Teesside, for disposal.

Pioneering Spirit installed the offshore section of SouthStream Transport B.V's dual  Turkish Stream pipeline in the Black Sea. The pipeline construction started in May 2017 and was completed in November 2018.

She has installed three out of four platform topsides for phase one of the Johan Sverdrup development in offshore Norway. The drilling platform (DP) topside was installed in June 2018. The other two topsides named P1 and LQ were installed in March 2019. With P1 topside weighing 26,000 tons, this is one of the heaviest single-lift executed offshore to date, after Wheatstone of 36,000 ton and Arkutun Dagi of 42,380 ton, both with the H 851. The vessel is expected to return in 2022 to install P2 topside weighing 27,000 tons for phase two of the Johan Sverdrup development.

It removed Valhall QP topside for Aker BP in June 2019. This structure was an accommodation platform in Valhall field, located in southern part of North Sea about 280 km off the Norwegian coast. Weighing 3800 ton, it is the lightest lift operation performed by the vessel.

In June 2019, Pioneering Spirit also removed the Brent Bravo 25,000-tonne topside located 186 km off the coast of Scotland on the way to Norway. She was also scheduled to remove the remaining two Brent field topsides for Shell, the 15,000 tonne Brent Alpha and 29,500 tonne Brent Charlie.

Future designs 
In 2018, Allseas announced its intention to build an even larger version of Pioneering Spirit, named Amazing Grace,  scheduled to be delivered in 2022. However, in July 2020, Allseas announced that it would suspend the project indefinitely.

References

External links
The original concept from 1989 
''Pioneering Spirit". Allseas
Pieter Schelte - "The project commences". (PDF). Allseas Group
Pieter Schelte Cylinders
Video

Ships of the Netherlands
Crane vessels
Pipe-laying ships
2013 ships
Individual catamarans